EMPI may refer to:

Enterprise master patient index, a large-scale medical records database system
EMPI, American manufacturers of various aftermarket parts for air-cooled Volkswagens and the EMPI Imp.

See also
ENPI